Pristobrycon careospinus is a species of serrasalmid endemic of Venezuela.

Habitat 
Habits mainly in black or acidic waters in Amazonas State of Venezuela (High Orinoco). The type locality is a lagoon near San Fernando de Atabapo in the confluence of the Atabapo and Orinoco rivers in Venezuela.

Description 
This is a beautiful fish . Body discoid with the anterodorsal profile slightly curved in a "S" shape. Head robust and wide. Snout blunt. Preanal spine and ectopterygoid teeth absent. Adipose fin wide. Head silver with methalic orange to red at mandibular region. Iris red. Body with greenish laterally and mixture of orange and red at the abdominal area. Body covered with round or oval black spots. Fins bright red. and

Behaviour 
Predatory fish. Consuming smaller fish and attacking fins, juveniles include aquatic insects and crustaceans (shrimps).  Occasionally included fruits from the surrounding gallery forest.  This is a solitary species. Never seen in schools.

Bibliography 
Fink, W. y A. Machado-Allison. 1992. Three new species of piranhas from Venezuela and Brazil. Ichthyological Explorations of Freshwaters, 2(1): 57-71.
Machado-Allison, A. y W. Fink. 1996. Los peces caribes de Venezuela: diagnosis, claves, espectos ecológicos y evolutivos. Universidad Central de Venezuela CDCH, (Colección Monografías) 52. 149p.  Caracas, Venezuela.

References

External links 
 Aquatic-experts: Video and photos of Pristobrycon careospinus

Fish of Venezuela
Endemic fauna of Venezuela
Serrasalmidae
Taxa named by William Lee Fink
Taxa named by Antonio Machado-Allison
Fish described in 1992